RISE SICS (previously Swedish Institute of Computer Science) is a leading research institute for applied information and communication technology in Sweden, founded in 1985.

It explores the digitalization of products, services and businesses.

In January 2005, SICS had about 88 employees, of which 77 were researchers, 30 with PhD degrees. , SICS had about 200 employees, of which 160 were researchers, 83 with PhD degrees. The institute is headquartered in the Kista district of Stockholm, with the main office in the Electrum building.

Software
Several well-known software packages have been developed at SICS:

Contiki, an operating system for small-memory embedded devices
Delegent, an authorization server
Distributed Interactive Virtual Environment or DIVE in short
lwIP, a TCP/IP stack for embedded systems
Oz-Mozart, a multi-platform programming system
Nemesis, a concept exokernel operating system
Protothreads, light-weight stackless threads
Quintus Prolog and SICStus Prolog, Prolog implementations
Simics, a full-system simulator originally developed at SICS
uIP, a TCP/IP stack for embedded systems

Academic output
The research at SICS results in approximately 100 refereed publications in academic journals, conferences and workshops per year. Around 2-4 SICS researchers receive higher academic degrees per year, and 1-3 persons move to academia for tenured positions.

SICS was ranked as the 15th most acknowledged computer science research institution in the world in an article in the December 2004 issue of the highly esteemed journal Proceedings of the National Academy of Sciences (PNAS). SICS is the only Swedish institution included in the list, and is one of two European institutions (the other one is INRIA) alongside 13 well-known American institutions, several of them larger than SICS.

Notable spin-off companies
 Dynarc (1997)
 Effnet (1997)
 Virtutech (1998)
 PipeBeach (1998) 
 Tacton Systems (1998) - knowledge based solutions for sales and product configuration 
 BotBox (1999) 
 Voxi (1999) 
 VerySolid (2004) 
 Axiomatics (2006) - security solutions for digital data assets
 Asimus (2006) - search technology
 Peerialism (2007) - scalable and flexible file storage and video streaming solutions
 Gavagai (2008) - scalable and robust representation of semantics of linguistic data

Funding
SICS is owned jointly, 60% by the Swedish government, and 40% by Swedish industry. The government owners are the Research Institutes of Sweden (RISE), Swedish ICT, and the Defence Materiel Administration (FMV). The industry owners are a consortium of Ericsson, Asea Brown Boveri (ABB), Saab Group, Green Cargo, Bombardier Transportation, and TeliaSonera.

SICS research is funded by the owners, by national funding sources, often Vinnova (the Swedish Government Agency for Innovation Systems) and the Swedish Foundation for Strategic Research (SSF), and by industrial collaboration partners. SICS also participates in several European research projects funded by the European Commission.

History
RISE SICS was formed in 1985 and is owned by the Swedish Government.

References

External links
 
 Tacton home page
 Axiomatics homepage
 Gavagai homepage
 Peerialism home page

Computer science institutes
Research institutes in Sweden
Members of the European Research Consortium for Informatics and Mathematics
Information technology research institutes